"Suddenly" is the third single by experimental trance musician BT from his sixth studio album, These Hopeful Machines.

Track listing

References

2010 singles
Trance songs
2010 songs
BT (musician) songs
Songs written by Christian Burns
Nettwerk Records singles